Drumming the Beating Heart is the fourth album by English band Eyeless in Gaza, released in 1982 by record label Cherry Red.

Content 

Regarding the album's style, AllMusic wrote that the album "finds the Nuneaton duo fashioning their stock sonic components into more immediately accessible, conventional song structures, albeit at the avant end of the pop spectrum".

Track listing
All tracks composed by Martyn Bates and Peter Becker
"Transience Blues"
"Ill-Wind Blows"
"One By One"
"Picture the Day"
"Dreaming at Rain"
"Two"
"Veil Like Calm"
"Throw a Shadow"
"Pencil Sketch"
"At Arms Length"
"Lights of April"
"Before You Go"

Reception 

NME called it "so much better than their previous sluggish experiments not because it’s more “commercial”, but because the endeavour required to redesign their form clarifies and strengthens it."

References

External links 

 

1982 albums
Eyeless in Gaza albums
Cherry Red Records albums